The Southern Way is the debut EP by UGK, which was released on cassette only in 1992. Side A is dubbed "Short Side" and Side B is dubbed "Texas Side".

Track listing
Short Side
"Cocaine in the Back of the Ride" (5:11)
"Short Texas" (7:41)
"Tell Me Something Good" (6:50)
Texas Side
"Trill Ass Nigga" (5:06)
"976-BUN-B" (3:27)
"Use Me Up" (4:34)
"Tell Me Something Good" (6:54) [Radio Mix]

UGK albums
1992 debut EPs
Gangsta rap EPs